Tarcisio Ostini (born 12 June 1958) is a retired Swiss football defender.

References

1958 births
Living people
Swiss men's footballers
AC Bellinzona players
Swiss Super League players
Association football defenders
Place of birth missing (living people)